Yasmin Ratansi (born January 4, 1951) is a Canadian politician who represented the Toronto area riding of Don Valley East in the House of Commons from 2004 to 2011 and again from 2015 to 2021. She was elected as a Liberal in the 2004 federal election and served until her defeat in 2011. She was re-elected in 2015 and 2019. Ratansi left the Liberal Party on November 9, 2020 following a CBC News investigation that revealed she had violated parliamentary rules by using public funds to employ her sister in her constituency office. Ratansi sat as an independent for the remainder of her term and did not seek re-election in the 2021 election.

Ratansi is an Ismaili Muslim and was the first Muslim woman elected to Parliament.

Before politics
Born in Dar es Salaam, Tanzania, she immigrated to Canada in 1974. She worked as a management consultant. She is a Certified General Accountant (CGA), a member of the Certified General Accountants of Ontario, and a fellow of the Certified General Accountants Association of Canada. In 2009, Ratansi was bestowed with the John Leslie Award by CGA Canada, given in recognition of CGAs "who have achieved a high and favourable profile in the Canadian community."

Politics
In 1979 Ratansi joined the Liberal Party of Canada and campaigned for David Collenette. Later she was the federal Liberal candidate for Don Valley East in the 1988 federal election. In the nomination for the Liberal candidacy leading up to the vote, rival Mel Catre complained that voting irregularities allowed Ratansi supporters to vote freely while his supporters were barred from voting. A subsequent investigation failed to prove these allegations. Ratansi finished in second place 2,838 votes behind the Conservative winner Alan Redway. She served on the party's federal campaign committee in 1992 and was treasurer of the party's Ontario wing from 1993 to 1997. In 1998 she served as one of three co-chairs on the campaign to elect Mel Lastman as mayor of the newly amalgamated city of Toronto.

In 2004 she ran again facing former-member of Provincial Parliament (MPP) David Johnson. During her campaign she spoke about the issue of immigrant underemployment. She also supported a publicly run health system. She won the riding by more than 10,000 votes.

During her tenure in Parliament, Ratansi sat through three parliamentary sessions. During this time she acted as the Official Opposition's critic for National Revenue and as critic for the Canada Revenue Agency. She also chaired a number of committees including the Status of Women Committee and the Standing Committee on Government Operations and Estimates. She has also served as Liberal caucus treasurer.

Constituency office controversy and departure from the Liberal Party

On November 9, 2020, a CBC News investigation revealed that from 2005 to 2011, and again from 2017 to 2020, Ratansi used public funds to employ her sister, Zeenat Khatri, as a constituency assistant in her constituency office. This was a direct violation of parliamentary rules, which were amended in 2012 to add siblings to the list of individuals forbidden from being hired (previously only parents, spouses, and children were listed).

Speaking with at least six former staffers, CBC News discovered both Ratansi and Khatri took various steps to conceal their relationship in the workplace. Staffers who were informed or became aware were pressured to uphold the ruse and "be complicit in unethical behaviour" while others were reportedly kept in the dark.

On November 9, 2020, 30 hours after being presented with the findings of the investigation, Ratansi announced on Facebook that she was leaving the Liberal Party and would continue to sit as an Independent while "awaiting guidance" from the Ethics Commissioner. Ratansi wrote that she "made an error in judgment by employing [her] sister in [her] constituency office, and [has] remedied the situation, but this [did] not excuse the error [she] made."

Liberal Party leader and Prime Minister Justin Trudeau condemned her actions as "deeply [disappointing]" and "unacceptable" while committing to an investigation by parliamentary administration officials.

In March 2021, the Board of Internal Economy ordered Ratansi to pay back $9,391 for employing her sister. At the time, the Ethics Commissioner was still investigating her for allegedly employing her sister, verbally harassing staffers, and uttering racist remarks about certain minorities. She did not seek re-election in the 2021 federal election.

Electoral record

References

External links
 

1951 births
Canadian accountants
Canadian Ismailis
Canadian women in business
Women members of the House of Commons of Canada
Independent MPs in the Canadian House of Commons
Liberal Party of Canada MPs
Living people
Members of the House of Commons of Canada from Ontario
Naturalized citizens of Canada
People from Dar es Salaam
People from Scarborough, Toronto
Politicians from Toronto
Tanzanian emigrants to Canada
Women in Ontario politics
21st-century Canadian politicians
21st-century Canadian women politicians
Canadian people of Gujarati descent
Canadian politicians of Indian descent
Khoja Ismailism